Sattar snowtrout (Schizothorax curvifrons) is a species of cyprinid native to the highlands of south-central Asia from Iran to China where it can be found in most types of freshwater habitats. It is important to local commercial fisheries.

The species is variable and some of its subpopulation possibly should be recognized as separate species. For example, S. intermedius and S. fedtschenkoi both are considered as synonyms of S. curvifrons by FishBase, but all three are recognized as valid species by the Catalog of Fishes.

References

External links
 Photograph

Schizothorax
Fish described in 1838